Anna Eleanor Roosevelt Seagraves ( Dall; born March 25, 1927) is an American librarian, educator, historian, and editor. She is a granddaughter of Franklin D. Roosevelt. Her parents are Anna Roosevelt Dall and her first husband Curtis Bean Dall. She is usually known as "Sistie", "Ellie" or "Eleanor".

Early life
Sistie, as she was affectionately called in the press during her grandparents' tenure in the White House, was named for her mother and for her maternal grandmother, Eleanor Roosevelt.  When her parents separated in 1933 (they divorced in 1934), she, along with her mother and brother Curtis, moved into the White House with her grandparents. Her mother would later remarry two more times and a younger half-brother, John Roosevelt Boettiger would join the family in 1939.

Career
Seagraves completed three years of college at Reed College before her marriage and later earned a master's degree in Library Science from the State University of New York at Geneseo in 1964.

Seagraves is one of the few living Roosevelt family members who witnessed events firsthand during the White House years. Seagraves also is one of the few surviving people who witnessed her grandmother Eleanor Roosevelt's diplomacy. Each year, when Seagraves' grandmother held a picnic at Val-Kill for delinquent boys, she assisted Mrs. Roosevelt with these events. She was close to Eleanor Roosevelt throughout her life.

Seagraves has enjoyed a career as an educator and librarian. She edited Delano's Voyages of Commerce and Discovery (Berkshire House Publishers, 1994), drawn from the journals of Amasa Delano, as well as The Val-Kill Cook Book (The Eleanor Roosevelt  Center at Val-Kill, 1984). Seagraves concentrated her career on keeping alive many of the causes her grandmother began and supported. She is an active participant in Democratic Party events in her area, and endorsed Barack Obama for the 2008 Presidential campaign. At , Seagraves resides with her husband in Maryland.

Marriage and children
On July 7, 1948, she married Van H. Seagraves.  Together, they had three children: 
 Nicholas Delano Seagraves (born August 7, 1949)
 David Delano Seagraves (born August 26, 1952)
 Anna Fierst (née Anna Eleanor Seagraves) (born August 16, 1955)

References

External links

1927 births
Living people
20th-century American women writers
20th-century American writers
21st-century American women
American women educators
American people of Dutch descent
American people of Scotch-Irish descent
American people of Scottish descent
Bulloch family
Delano family
Livingston family
New York (state) Democrats
Writers from New York City
People from Briarcliff Manor, New York
Reed College alumni
Eleanor Roosevelt Seagraves
State University of New York at Geneseo alumni
Schuyler family
Educators from New York City
American women librarians
American librarians